In military terms, 149th Division or 149th Infantry Division may refer to:

 149th Division (People's Republic of China)
 Israeli 149th Division
 149th Division (Imperial Japanese Army)